Abu Zayd al-Hilali is a 1947 Egyptian film that portrays the life of the tenth-century Arabic leader and hero Abu Zayd al-Hilali. It was directed by Ezzel Dine Zulficar and written by Zulficar and Abu Butheina. It stars Faten Hamama, Seraj Munir, and Amina al-Sharif. It was one of Hamama's earliest starring roles.

Plot 
Abu Zayd al-Hilali's son and wife escape and years later, after his son has grown into a powerful and idealistic man, a battle between the two tribes starts. The son fights his father but is not aware who he is fighting. The Banu Hilalis defeat the Banu Zahlanis. Back home, Abu Zayd is greeted as a hero. A huge war then starts with the Zirids, who had abandoned Shiism. The Banu Hilalis weaken the Zirid state and plunder their lands.

Cast 
Seraj Munir as Abu Zayd al-Hilali
Faten Hamama as daughter of the Caliph
Amina Sharif as Abu Zayd's mother
Lula Sidqi
Ahmed El Bey
Fakher Fakher

References

External links 
 

1940s biographical films
1947 films
1940s Arabic-language films
Egyptian biographical films
Egyptian black-and-white films
Films directed by Ezz El-Dine Zulficar